Jendouba Governorate is one of the twenty-four governorates of Tunisia. It is predominantly in the high hills of the Tell Atlas north-western Tunisia, bordering Algeria and the Mediterranean Sea. It covers an area of 3,102 km2 and has a population of 401,477 (2014 census). The capital is Jendouba.

Administrative divisions
The governorate is divided into nine delegations (mutamadiyat), listed below with their populations at the 2004 and 2014 Censuses:

The following eight municipalities are located in Jendouba Governorate:

Notable people
 Boubaker Ayadi (March 6, 1949) is an author, professor and journalist.
 Salah Mejri

References

External links 
 Ain Kroumir - Regional Website of Northwest Tunisia

 
Governorates of Tunisia